Simon Conway is a London-born radio show host and public speaker who hosts a talk show on WHO-AM in Des Moines, Iowa.

Early life
Conway was born in London, England and raised in nearby Wellesden. There he got the journalism bug at a young age:

Moving to Israel as a teenager, Conway began his professional career as a 16-year-old journalist at The Jerusalem Post (in 1976). From the age of 18, back in the U.K., he was "doing shifts" on the Sunday Mirror and News of the World. He went undercover to investigative "the awful Children of God sect" and "stuff for Panorama on the National Front" back.

Career 
In the U.K. Conway was "doing almost daily hits" on BBC Radio 4 or Radio 5 Live. He had international media in his studio on a regular basis, while being "constantly interviewed" by U.S. media—with "multiple appearances" on C-Span, CNN, and Fox News. He ran a successful corporate communications company in the U.K.

He moved to Orlando, Florida, in 2001, entering the real estate business, which Conway discovered was highly competitive. “There are thousands of people selling real estate in Orlando, literally,” he said, which led Conway "to distinguish himself by buying time on the radio." When he got himself a one-hour weekend show he "fell in love with the medium." “From the very first moment I was on the air, I did not talk about real estate,” Conway recalls. “It was like an epiphany. I had come home.”

Conway "fell into a career as a fill-in talk show host," travelling across the U.S. working at “major, major stations”.

WHO-AM 
In 2011, Conway took a radio show hosting position at WHO-AM in Des Moines, Iowa, replacing Steve Deace who left for a nationally-syndicated show — and adding his name to the station's "storied roster of hosts", including former president Ronald Reagan who "made a name for himself" as a WHO sportscaster in the 1930s. On taking the job, Conway says, “If you're serious about talk radio, this isn't a job you turn down.”

Iowa caucuses 
"It's a big country and the parties pick their candidates by asking the people in a series of primary elections or as in the case of Iowa, Caucuses. And Iowa is first in the nation to vote which can give a candidate the kind of momentum it takes to become President," Conway emphasizes.

About 65,000 people across Iowa tune in to WHO-AM during the afternoon drive time, the largest in Iowa for talk radio. And the audience skews toward the politically-attuned, conservative type that Republican candidates want to attract.

Style 
Considered "the voice of Midwest conservatism," Conway reminds one journalist of "a bulldog when he interviews politicians." His training in Britain formed his aggressive approach on the air, he said. “I am an equal-opportunity hater. I treat people the same whether I agree with them or [they] don't agree with me. I will always challenge their positions." He adds, “There are [as many] Republicans who don't want to face those questions as there are Democrats. The likes of [Ohio governor] John Kasich haven't been in my studio because he knows it isn't going to end well.”

"Most important of all for me – no script," Conway admits. "I am very much a stream of consciousness person and that's why we deliver what we hope is compelling radio every single day." He arranges regular, unscientific online audience polls meant for entertainment on his show.

Controversy 

 Conway goaded Ron Paul in 2011 into admitting his noninterventionist foreign policy would have prevented him from executing the raid that killed Osama bin Laden.
When The Des Moines Register published an interactive map allowing readers to identify schools that did not have security guards in 2013, Conway declared that they had provided "a shopping list for every nut job in Iowa."
Conway has been an opponent of camera-generating traffic tickets stating in 2014: “The cameras are about money and only money. Cameras have absolutely nothing to do with safety, and the devices actually cause wrecks. If yellow-light times were increased by one second, wrecks at those intersections can be reduced by 50 percent.”
Following Iowa's move to increase the gas tax by 10 cents a gallon in 2015, Conway urged his listeners to re-register as independents and "ditch the GOP".
 In 2017, Conway interviewed CEO of MidAmerican Energy, Bill Fehrman, who admitted on air that 100% of the cost of wind turbines comes from taxes — used to fund related tax credits — confirming that industrial wind and solar are not economic. 
After questions arose surrounding the 2020 presidential election results, Conway stated: “It seems we are destined to go through this now, however, where our country is split in half. And four years ago, about half the country said, ‘We don't trust these results.’ And now, we’ve got about half the country saying, ‘We don't trust these results.’ It's really dangerous for the republic, right?”
 In 2020 Conway stated live on air that vaccinations cause autism in children, while interviewing a childhood pediatrician. 
Conway has spent most of 2021 on his radio show claiming that facemasks do not work (despite providing no credible sources with abstracts confirming this theory). He also conflates masking children in school as "child abuse" with no explanation. 
After the conviction of the Mollie Tibbets killer, Conway devoted time on his show to attack Mexican immigrants and reaffirm his beliefs on deportation and removal on illegal immigrants. Despite (and stating this on his show) the wishes of Tibbets parents to not make her death about race or citizenship.

Stations 

 1040 WHO/Des Moines (4pm-7pm) CDT
 1420 WOC/Quad Cities (4pm-6pm) CDT
 600 WMT/Cedar Rapids (4pm-6pm) CDT
 540 WFLA/Orlando
 News Radio 1140 WRVA/Richmond
 Talk Radio 105-5 WERC/Birmingham
 News Radio 630 WLAP/Lexington
 KOGO/San Diego (fill-in)
 WOAI/San Antonio (fill-in)
 KTLK/Minneapolis (fill-in)

Charity 
Conway serves as a Trustee on the Board of Directors for the USS Iowa (BB-61). He has led regular tours to southern California to visit the retired ship, now opened as a museum. He annually sponsors a "BBQ sandwich giveaway" for the benefit of the Puppy Jake Foundation, which trains service dogs to be placed with "wounded warriors". Raising $4,000 in its first year, the event raised over $35,500 five years later in 2018. Generally a local supermarket donates the meat, more than 200 pounds of it, and a local barbecue grilling champion donates buns and sauce and does the cooking.

Personal 
Conway is Jewish and moved to Israel when he was 16. He has two daughters. He is a "very proud naturalized American citizen." For five years he coached both men's and women's high school tennis in Orlando, Florida.

After suffering two heart attacks during one week in 2017, Conway quit smoking and returned to the broadcast booth. Joel McCrea, general manager at WHO-AM, told the Des Moines Register the heart attacks were mild in nature.

In 2008 Conway received American citizenship. He has said of his homeland, "I miss the curry. Friends. And the ability to go watch Chelsea play."

References

External links 

 iHeart Radio: WHO-AM Simon Conway
 C-Span Simon Conway
 Bruce Merrin's Celebrity Speakers Simon Conway

Living people
American broadcast news analysts
American political commentators
American social commentators
American conservative talk radio hosts
People from London
Radio personalities from Iowa
English expatriates in the United States
1960 births